Palmyra, Illinois may refer to places in the U.S. state of Illinois:

Palmyra, Illinois, a village
Palmyra, Edwards County, Illinois, a ghost town
Palmyra, Lee County, Illinois, an unincorporated community